Raiders of the Seven Seas is a 1953 American swashbuckler film directed by Sidney Salkow and starring John Payne and Donna Reed.  The supporting cast features Gerald Mohr, Lon Chaney Jr. and Anthony Caruso.

Plot
The pirate Barbarossa raids the Sultan of Morocco's ships and captures a betrothed woman.

Cast
John Payne as Barbarossa
Donna Reed as Alida
Gerald Mohr as Capt. Jose Salcedo
Lon Chaney Jr. as  Peg Leg
Anthony Caruso as Renzo
Henry Brandon as Capt. Goiti
Skip Torgerson as Datu
Frank De Kova as Capt. Romero
William Tannen as Ramon
Christopher Dark as Pablo
Claire DuBrey as Señora Salcedo
Howard Freeman as Mayor Pompano

Production
The film was originally known as Storm over the Caribbean, Barbarossa and Swords Against the Mast. It was an original story co written by director Sidney Salkow, who subsequently signed a long-term contract with producer Edward Small.

See also
Flame of Araby (1951), with Barbarossa and his brother as villains
 List of films featuring slavery

References

External links

1953 films
1953 adventure films
American adventure films
Films set in Morocco
Films set in the Caribbean
Films set in the Mediterranean Sea
Pirate films
Films produced by Edward Small
Films scored by Paul Sawtell
1950s English-language films
United Artists films
1950s American films